Republic N&T Railroad is a line-haul operator in Canton, Ohio that operates on Norfolk Southern there. The company was formed in 2008. Reporting mark NTRY.

References

Ohio railroads